James Walker (25 April 1926 – 2 June 1996) was an Australian alpine skier. He competed in the men's giant slalom at the 1956 Winter Olympics.

References

1926 births
1996 deaths
Australian male alpine skiers
Olympic alpine skiers of Australia
Alpine skiers at the 1956 Winter Olympics
Skiers from Sydney